Nickel(III) fluoride is the chemical compound with the formula NiF3. It is an ionic compound of nickel and fluorine.

Preparation
Nickel(III) fluoride can be prepared by the reaction of Potassium hexafluoronickelate(IV) with arsenic pentafluoride in hydrofluoric acid.

References

Nickel compounds
Fluorides
Metal halides